Zale galbanata, the maple zale, is a species of moth in the family Erebidae. It is found in North America.

The MONA or Hodges number for Zale galbanata is 8692.

References

Further reading

 
 
 
 

Omopterini
Moths described in 1876